Ad-Dawhah (or ad-Dōḥa) is the one of the eight municipalities of Qatar. It is the most populous municipality with a population of 956,457, and is the municipality of  Qatar's capital city, Doha.

Etymology
According to the Ministry of Municipality and Environment, the name "Doha" originated from the Arabic term "dohat", which means "roundness". This name is derived from the rounded bays surrounding the area's coastline.

Administration

According to the Ministry of Municipality and Urban Planning, the Municipality of Qatar became the first municipality to be established in 1963. Later that year, the name was changed to Municipality of Ad Dawhah. The country has been divided into eight municipalities since 2014. Doha is the most populated municipality among them with a population of 956,457 as of 2015.

The exclave of Doha Industrial Area and the island of Halul, 80 km (50 miles) away from Doha, fall within municipal boundaries.

Municipal headquarters were shifted from the Al Sadd area to Ras Abu Aboud in 2017.

Neighborhoods

District centers

As part of the Qatar National Master Plan, twenty-eight centers have been designated throughout Qatar to promote sustained urban development and to better implement public transport. Centers serve as hubs for surrounding districts. The centers range from Capital City Center to District Center, with the former being the highest-level designation and vice versa.

Geography
Doha municipality is in the central east region of Qatar; it is bordered by Al Wakrah municipality to the south, Al Rayyan municipality to the west, Al Daayen municipality to the north and Umm Salal municipality to the northwest.

Comprising the majority of Qatar's residential, financial and administrative centers, the Doha Metropolitan area hosts over 80% of the country's inhabitants. The core of Doha, which is the easternmost area of the municipality, is the administrative and financial hub of the country and the municipality, with districts such as Al Dafna and West Bay being located here. Moreover, this area also accommodates critical infrastructure such as Hamad Medical City and Hamad International Airport.

Other areas of importance include the Industrial Area, an exclave in Al Rayyan municipality, as well as the Wholesale Market Area, which encompasses the western portion of the municipality and which unofficially includes areas of Al Rayyan.

In the northern region of Doha, developments such as the Katara Cultural Village and The Pearl-Qatar, which is projected to house as many as 45,000 residents, can be found. The northern part of the West Bay financial district is also located here. Towards the center of the municipality is the Amiri Diwan, Souq Waqif, the Doha Corniche and the historic quarters.

Most of the low-to-medium density housing projects are found in the western sector, near the Wholesale Market Area. Residential areas in western Doha include Al Sadd, Abu Hamour and Al Gharafa, of which the latter two are geographically located in Al Rayyan but which constitute a part of Metropolitan Doha.

According to the Ministry of Municipality and Environment, the municipality accommodates five rawdas, one wadi, three plains, seven hills, two sabkhas, four capes, and two bays. Four islands are found off its shores, not including The Pearl.

Infrastructure

Education
As the most populous municipality, Doha contains the highest density of schools in the country. Most of the municipality's schools are near the core of Doha, i.e. the central eastern portion. There is a reported shortage of schools in the Al Sadd district, as well as the northernmost and southernmost sectors.

Healthcare
A major healthcare project known as Hamad Medical City was launched in 2003 near the Rumeilah district. Three hospitals and a research center were planned to be hosted within this 227,000 square meter (56 acre) complex at a cost of over QR 2.1 billion. In December 2017, Hamad Medical City was officially opened in a ceremony attended by the Emir of Qatar, Tamim bin Hamad Al Thani.

Transport
The Doha Metro connects the core of Doha with its metropolitan hubs. At the center of the Doha Metro system is Msheireb Station, where there are three alignments, with an additional line being constructed, and a bus rapid transit system to which to connect.

References

Municipalities of Qatar